Mohammad Shah Alam (born 20 April 1961) is a politician, lawyer, businessman, and the former Member of Parliament from Brahmanbaria-4 (Kasba-Akhaura).

Career
Shah Alam was elected to parliament from Brahmanbaria-4 (Kasba-Akhaura) as a Bangladesh Awami League candidate in 1996, 2001 and 2008. He served as the Vice-President of Brahmanbaria district unit of Bangladesh Awami League. He is former chairman of Standing Committee on Ministry of Hill Tracts and member of Standing Committee on Ministry of Railway (since 2008–2014).

References

Awami League politicians
Living people
7th Jatiya Sangsad members
9th Jatiya Sangsad members
1961 births